The seminal tract is a part of the male reproductive system and consists of Seminiferous tubules (Tubuli seminiferi recti, Rete testis, Efferent ducts), Epididymis  (Appendix), Vas deferens (Ampulla) and Ejaculatory duct.

References

Mammal male reproductive system